The 2016–17 season was İstanbul Başakşehir's eighth consecutive season in the Süper Lig and their 27th year in existence. This season, İstanbul Başakşehir participated in the Süper Lig, Turkish Cup and UEFA Europa League. The season covers the period from 28 July 2016 to 4 June 2017.

Transfers

In

Out

First team squad

Statistics

Competitions

Overview

Pre-season, mid-season and friendlies

Süper Lig

League table

Results summary

Pld = Matches played; W = Matches won; D = Matches drawn; L = Matches lost; GF = Goals for; GA = Goals against; GD = Goal difference; Pts = Points

Results by round

Matches

Turkish Cup

Group stage
Group F

Pld = Matches played; W = Matches won; D = Matches drawn; L = Matches lost; GF = Goals for; GA = Goals against; GD = Goal difference; Pts = Points

Matches

Knockout phase

UEFA Europa League

Third qualifying round

2–2 on aggregate. İstanbul Başakşehir won on away goals.

Play-off round

İstanbul Başakşehir lose 1–4 on aggregate.

Notes

References

İstanbul Başakşehir F.K. seasons
Turkish football clubs 2016–17 season